Przesieka may refer to the following places in Poland:
Przesieka, Lower Silesian Voivodeship (south-west Poland)
Przesieka, Podlaskie Voivodeship (north-east Poland)